Coal Run, Pennsylvania can refer to:
Coal Run, Clearfield County, Pennsylvania
Coal Run, Indiana County, Pennsylvania
Coal Run, Northumberland County, Pennsylvania
Coal Run, Somerset County, Pennsylvania